Eupithecia maenamiella is a moth in the family Geometridae. It is found in Japan.

References

Moths described in 1980
maenamiella
Moths of Japan